Hanis, or Coos, was one of two Coosan languages of Oregon, and the better documented. It was spoken north of the Miluk around the Coos River and Coos Bay. The há·nis was the Hanis name for themselves. The last speaker of Hanis was Martha Harney Johnson, who died in 1972. Another speaker was Annie Miner Peterson, who worked with linguist Melville Jacobs to document the language.

As of 2007, classes in Hanis were offered by the Confederated Tribes of Coos, Lower Umpqua and Siuslaw Indians. A book and CD, Hanis for Beginners, were published in 2011, and a companion website is available for tribal members at hanis.org.

Phonology
Vowels  may be long or short; there is also a short .

The  series are optionally voiced.  may be syllabic. Stress is phonemic.

References

 Frachtenberg, Leo J. (1913). Coos texts. California University contributions to anthropology (Vol. 1). New York: Columbia University Press. (Reprinted 1969 New York: AMS Press).
 Frachtenberg, Leo J. (1922). Coos: An illustrative sketch. In Handbook of American Indian languages (Vol. 2, pp. 297–299, 305). Bulletin, 40, pt. 2. Washington:Government Print Office (Smithsonian Institution, Bureau of American Ethnology).
Grant, Anthony. (1996). John Milhau's 1856 Hanis vocabularies: Coos dialectology and philology. In V. Golla (Ed.), Proceedings of the Hokan–Penutian workshop: University of Oregon, Eugene, July 1994 and University of New Mexico, Albuquerque, July 1995. Survey of California and other Indian languages (No. 9). Berkeley, CA: Survey of California and Other Languages.
Pierce, Joe E. 1971. Hanis (Coos) phonemics. Linguistics 75. 31-42.

External links 

 (pronunciation guide)

OLAC resources in and about the Coos language

Coosan languages
Languages extinct in the 1970s
1972 disestablishments in Oregon